The following is a timeline of the history of the city of Prague, Czech Republic.

Prior to 16th century

 870 CE – Prague Castle founded
 10th C. - Vyšehrad (the "upper castle") is built.
 973
 St. George's Convent established in Prague Castle.
 St. George's Basilica building expanded.
 1085 – Coronation of Vratislaus II of Bohemia.
 1172 –  built.
 1235 – Wenceslaus I of Bohemia organised the building of a City wall.
 1261 - Ottokar II of Bohemia crowned in Prague.
 1270 – Great Synagogue built.
 1344 – Catholic Archdiocese of Prague established.
 1345 – University of Prague founded.
 1347 - The black death killed millions.
 1347 – 2 September: Coronation of Charles IV as King of Bohemia; Prague becomes capital of the Holy Roman Empire.
 1348 – New Town founded outside Prague city walls.
 1354 - Public clock installed (approximate date).
 1363 – St. Wenceslas Chapel built
 1370 – Tyn Church construction begins.
 1386 – Karolinum rebuilt.
 1391 – Bethlehem Chapel built.
 1398 – Town Hall built in New Town.
 1410 – Astronomical clock installed in City Hall.
 1419 – Defenestration (political unrest).
 1458 – Coronation of George of Poděbrady as King of Bohemia.
 1475 – Powder Tower built.
 1478 - Printing press in operation.
 1483 - second Defenestration of Prague.

16th-18th centuries
 1501 - Czech-language Protestant hymnal published.
 1503 – Charles Bridge built.
 1568 - High Synagogue (Prague) finished.
 1580 - Loew reportedly invents the Golem of Prague.
 1586 - Jewish Town Hall (Prague) constructed.
 1590 - Maisel Synagogue construction begins.
 1604 - October: Kepler observes a Milky Way supernova.
 1618 – 23 May: 2nd Prague defenestration sparked off the Thirty Years' War.
 1621 – 21 June: Execution of 27 Czech nobles on the Old Town Square as a consequence of the Battle of White Mountain.
 1631 - Gustavus Adolphus, king of Sweden, briefly occupied the town.
 1635 – 30 May: City hosts signing of the Peace of Prague (1635).
 1648
 West bank of Prague (including the Prague Castle) occupied and looted by Swedish armies.
 Peace of Westphalia "put a stop to hostilities".
 1650 – Column of the Virgin erected in Old Town Square.
 1724 – Sporck theatre active.
 1738 – Palais Sylva-Tarouca built on Na příkopě.
 1739 – Kotzentheater active.
 1741 – November: Occupation by French-Bavarian armies.
 1742 – Siege of Prague (1742).
 1744 – City occupied by Prussian forces.
 1755 – St. Nicholas Church built.
 1757 - 6 May: Siege of Prague.
 1765 – Goltz Palace built.
 1783 – Nostitz Theatre opens.
 1784 – Administration of Hradčany, Malá Strana, New Town, and Old Town unified as one city.
 1787
 19 January: Premiere of Mozart's Prague Symphony.
 29 October: Premiere of Mozart's opera Don Giovanni.
 1791
 6 September: Coronation of Leopold II as King of Bohemia.
 6 September: Premiere of Mozart's La clemenza di Tito.
 1796
 Lithography invented.
 Academy of Fine Arts and the Picture Gallery established.

19th century
 1813 – July–October: City hosts meeting of the Coalition forces of the Napoleonic Wars.
 1818 – Bohemian Museum founded.
 1825 – Savings bank established.
 1841 –  built.
 1847 – Austrian National Bank branch opens.
 1848
 2–12 June: Prague Slavic Congress, 1848 held.
 17 June: Revolutionary uprising near Prague crushed by imperial army.
 Old Town Hall rebuilt.
 1850
 Josefov becomes part of city.
 Statue of Francis I erected in the Franzensquai.
 1851 - Prague City Archives established.
 1857
  in business.
 Industrial school established.
 1862
 Sokol sport club founded.
 Provisional Theatre opens.
 1866 – City hosts signing of the Peace of Prague (1866).
 1868
 Živnostenská banka (bank) founded.
 Spanish Synagogue built.
 1876 – Prager Tagblatt German-language newspaper begins publication.
 1877 – Premiere of Dvořák's Symphonic Variations.
 1879 – Anglo-Austrian Bank branch established.
 1880 – Population: 293,822 metro.
 1882 – Charles University reorganized into German- and Czech-language institutions.
 1883
 Vyšehrad becomes part of city.
 Czech Theatre built.
 National Theatre Ballet founded.
 1884
 Café Slavia opens.
 Holešovice-Bubna becomes part of city.
 Klausen Synagogue reconstructed.
 1885
 Rudolfinum (concert hall) inaugurated.
 Museum of Decorative Arts founded.
 1888 – Neues Deutsches Theater opens.
 1890
 2 February: Premiere of Dvořák's Symphony No. 8.
 September: Flood.
 Population: 182,530.
 1891
 Petřín Lookout Tower and Bohemian Museum building constructed.
 Hanavský Pavilion built in Letná Park.
 General Land Centennial Exhibition (1891) held.
 1896
 Czech Philharmonic established.
 Population: 189,157; metro 368,490.
 1897 - Unrest.
 1898
 Bohemian Industrial Bank headquartered in city.
 Civic museum opens on Poric Street.
 1900
 Old Prague Society founded.
 Museum of Decorative Arts in Prague opened.

20th century

 1901
 Liben becomes part of city.
 Francis Bridge built.
 1905 - Unrest for "an extension of the suffrage".
 1906
 Prague-Velká Chuchle Racecourse opens.
 Jewish Museum founded.
 Population: 460,849 metro.
 1907 – Vinohrady Theatre inaugurated.
 1908
 May–June: City hosts Prague 1908 chess tournament.
 19 September: Premiere of Mahler's Symphony No. 7.
 1909 - Smíchov becomes part of Prague.
 1910 - Population: 223,741.
 1916 – May: City premiere of Janáček's Jenůfa.
 1918
  (cinema) opens.
 October: City becomes capital of Czechoslovakia.
 1921 – Communist Party of Czechoslovakia headquartered in city.
 1922
  created by uniting Prague with its suburbs and neighboring towns; 37 municipalities added.
 Vinohrady and Žižkov become part of Prague.
 Population: 676,000.
 1930 – Population: 848,823.
 1931 – Prague Zoo opens.
 1934 - Prague Symphony Orchestra founded.
 1939
 March: Nazi German occupation of city begins.
 City becomes seat of German Protectorate of Bohemia and Moravia.
 1942 – 27 May: German official Reinhard Heydrich assassinated; Nazis respond with wave of terror.
 1945
 14 February: Bombing of Prague in World War II.
 5–8 May: Prague uprising against the Nazi German occupants during the last days of World War II.
 6–11 May: Prague Offensive: arrival of the Red Army; Nazi German occupation ends.
 Expulsion of German citizens
 Academy of Performing Arts in Prague established.
 1946
 Prague Spring International Music Festival begins.
 Faculty of Theatre established.
 1948
 February: 1948 Czechoslovak coup d'état.
 May: City hosts The Second International Congress of Composers and Music Critics 1948.
 1952
 Slánský trial.
 Prague Radio Symphony Orchestra active.
 1954 – Bethlehem Chapel reconstructed.
 1958 – Theatre on the Balustrade founded.
 1955 – Stalin Monument unveiled at Letná Park.
 1957 – Reduta Jazz Club opens on Národní.
 1962 - Stalin Monument destroyed.
 1964 – Prague Ballet active.
 1968 – Prague Spring; Soviet crackdown.
 1969
Jan Palach's self-immolation.
City becomes capital of the Czech Socialist Republic.
 1970 –  founded.
 1973 – 11 December: City hosts signing of the Treaty of Prague (1973).
 1974
 Prague Metro founded.
 Population: 1,095,615.
 1978 – Charles Bridge pedestrianized.
 1985 - Population: 1,190,576 (estimate).
 1989 – November–December: Velvet Revolution.
 1990 – City divided into 56 districts.
 1991
 School of International Relations, University of Economics in Prague established.
 Prager Zeitung German-language newspaper begins publication.
 Prague Metronome erected.
 1992
 Žižkov Television Tower erected.
 Academy of Sciences of the Czech Republic headquartered in city.
 1993 – 1 January: Prague becomes capital of the Czech Republic.
 1995 – U.S. Radio Free Europe/Radio Liberty headquartered in city.
 1996
 City hosts World Congress of Esperanto; manifesto drafted.
 Dancing House built.
 1997 – Via Foundation headquartered in city.
 1998 – University of New York in Prague established.
 1999 - Prague Mosque built.

21st century

 2001 – Prague Fringe Festival begins.
 2002
 August: Prague suffers from flooding, parts of the city evacuated, many historic archives damaged but no major landmarks destroyed.
 Broadway Theatre (Prague) opens.
 Prague Security Studies Institute established.
 November: City hosts NATO summit.
 2007 – The Codex Gigas returns to Prague after 379 years
 2008 - Prague Declaration.
 2009 – 5 April: U.S. president gives speech on nuclear disarmament.
 2010 – September: Economic protest.
 2011 – Population: 1,262,106; metro 2,300,000.
 2013
 29 April: 2013 Prague explosion.
 Tomáš Hudeček becomes mayor.
 2014 Adriana Krnáčová becomes mayor.

See also
 History of Prague
 List of mayors of Prague
 List of rulers of Bohemia, 9th-20th century, official residence in Prague
 Timelines of other cities in the Czech Republic: Brno

References

Bibliography

in English
 
 
 
 
 
 
 
 
 
 
 
 
 
 
 
 
  (about Berlin, Budapest, Prague, Warsaw)

in Czech
  v.2, Malá Strana, 1896

in German

External links

 Europeana. Items related to Prague, various dates.

 
Prague
prague
Years in Czechoslovakia
Years in the Czech Republic
Prague